"Helen of Kirkconnel" is a famous Scottish ballad.

History

It was published by Walter Scott in Volume 2 of Minstrelsy of the Scottish Border.  An early version was also published by John Mayne.  It is also known as "Kirkconnel Lea" and "Fair Helen".

Here is one explanation of the story behind the ballad:

It was published by Scott as "Fair Helen of Kirconnell".  Nowadays most versions of the ballad use the current spelling of the town Kirkconnel.

A popular tune to which the ballad was sung became the basis for a hymn tune, "Martyrdom", adapted by Hugh Wilson of Duntocher around 1800. A later version of Wilson's tune by Robert A. Smith is used in numerous modern hymnals.

Text
This is the exact version published by Scott.

References

External links
Another explanation of the story behind the ballad  
A link giving an alternative version 
  is a poetic response by Felicia Hemans in The Winter's Wreath annual for 1829.

Scottish ballads